The moths of Mozambique represent about 520 known species. Moths (mostly nocturnal) and butterflies (mostly diurnal) together make up the taxonomic order Lepidoptera.

This is a list of moth species which have been recorded in Mozambique.

Adelidae
Ceromitia aphroneura Meyrick, 1930
Ceromitia crinigerella (Zeller, 1850)
Ceromitia systelitis Meyrick, 1921
Nemophora humilis (Walsingham, 1891)

Alucitidae
Alucita flaviserta (Meyrick, 1921)
Alucita granata (Meyrick, 1921)
Alucita myriodesma (Meyrick, 1929)

Arctiidae
Acanthofrontia dicycla Hampson, 1918
Alpenus investigatorum (Karsch, 1898)
Amata alicia (Butler, 1876)
Amata bifasciata (Hopffer, 1857)
Amata caerulescens (Druce, 1898)
Amata francisca (Butler, 1876)
Amerila affinis (Rothschild, 1910)
Amerila lupia (Druce, 1887)
Amerila magnifica (Rothschild, 1910)
Amphicallia bellatrix (Dalman, 1823)
Apisa grisescens (Dufrane, 1945)
Argina amanda (Boisduval, 1847)
Asura sagenaria (Wallengren, 1860)
Caripodia consimilis Hampson, 1918
Diota rostrata (Wallengren, 1860)
Eilema bifasciata Hampson, 1900
Eilema phaeopera Hampson, 1900
Epitoxis nigra Hampson, 1903
Estigmene linea (Walker, 1855)
Euchromia amoena (Möschler, 1872)
Euchromia folletii (Guérin-Méneville, 1832)
Eyralpenus diplosticta (Hampson, 1900)
Eyralpenus scioana (Oberthür, 1880)
Lepista aposema Kühne, 2010
Lepista pandula (Boisduval, 1847)
Metarctia flavivena Hampson, 1901
Metarctia rufescens Walker, 1855
Micralarctia punctulatum (Wallengren, 1860)
Nudaria quilimanensis Strand, 1922
Nudaria quilimanicola Strand, 1922
Nyctemera apicalis (Walker, 1854)
Nyctemera leuconoe Hopffer, 1857
Ochrota unicolor (Hopffer, 1857)
Paralacydes arborifera (Butler, 1875)
Paralacydes ramosa (Hampson, 1907)
Paurophleps reducta (Janse, 1964)
Phryganopsis cinerella (Wallengren, 1860)
Pseudonaclia puella (Boisduval, 1847)
Rhodogastria amasis (Cramer, 1779)
Pusiola holoxantha (Hampson, 1918)
Secusio mania Druce, 1887
Secusio monteironis Rothschild, 1933
Siccia quilimania Strand, 1922
Spilosoma lineata Walker, 1855
Thyretes caffra Wallengren, 1863
Utetheisa pulchella (Linnaeus, 1758)

Autostichidae
Holcopogon scaeocentra Meyrick, 1921

Batrachedridae
Idioglossa triumphalis Meyrick, 1918

Brachodidae
Nigilgia mochlophanes (Meyrick, 1921)

Choreutidae
Brenthia pleiadopa Meyrick, 1921
Choreutis dryodora (Meyrick, 1921)
Choreutis irridens (Meyrick, 1921)
Choreutis stereocrossa (Meyrick, 1921)

Cosmopterigidae
Alloclita zelotypa Meyrick, 1918
Labdia macrobela Meyrick, 1918
Limnaecia conjuncta Meyrick, 1921
Macrobathra peraeota Meyrick, 1921
Stilbosis cyclocosma (Meyrick, 1921)

Cossidae
Eulophonotus stephania (Druce, 1887)
Phragmataecia innominata Dalla Torre, 1923
Phragmataecia irrorata Hampson, 1910

Crambidae
Adelpherupa flavescens Hampson, 1919
Agathodes musivalis Guenée, 1854
Ancylolomia capensis Zeller, 1852
Ancylolomia obscurella de Joannis, 1927
Ancylolomia parentii Bassi, 2014
Angustalius casandra Bassi,2014
Angustalius malacellus (Duponchel, 1836)
Bocchoris nuclealis de Joannis, 1927
Calamoschoena stictalis Hampson, 1919
Calamotropha dagamae Bassi, 2014
Calamotropha mesostrigalis (Hampson, 1919)
Calamotropha paludella (Hübner, 1824)
Calamotropha toxophorus (de Joannis, 1927)
Calamotropha virginiae Bassi, 2014
Chilo diffusilinea (de Joannis, 1927)
Chilo orichalcociliella (Strand, 1911)
Chilo partellus (Swinhoe, 1885)
Chilo sacchariphagus (Bojer, 1856)
Chilo williami (de Joannis, 1927)
Chrysocatharylla agraphellus (Hampson, 1919)
Chrysocatharylla oenescentellus (Hampson, 1886)
Classeya bicuspidalis (Hampson, 1919)
Cotachena smaragdina (Butler, 1875)
Crambus bellinii Bassi, 2014
Culladia achroellum (Mabille, 1900)
Dejoannisia pallidella (de Joannis, 1927)
Epichilo obscurefasciellus (de Joannis, 1927)
Euchromius klimeschi Błeszyński, 1961
Euchromius mythus Błeszyński, 1970
Euclasta varii Popescu-Gorj & Constantinescu, 1973
Ischnurges lancinalis (Guenée, 1854)
Nomophila noctuella ([Denis & Schiffermüller], 1775)
Orphanostigma excisa (Martin, 1956)
Parapoynx stagnalis (Zeller, 1852)
Parotis invernalis (de Joannis, 1927)
Pediasia ematheudellus (de Joannis, 1927)
Pediasia nephelostictus (de Joannis, 1927)
Prochoristis calamochroa (Hampson, 1919)
Prochoristis lophopedalis (de Joannis, 1927)
Scirpophaga marginepunctellus (de Joannis, 1927)
Spoladea recurvalis (Fabricius, 1775)
Surattha africalis Hampson, 1919

Elachistidae
Cryphioxena haplomorpha Meyrick, 1921
Ethmia sabiella (Felder & Rogenhofer, 1875)
Orophia hadromacha (Meyrick, 1937)
Orophia languidula (Meyrick, 1921)
Trachydora scandalotis Meyrick, 1921

Eriocottidae
Compsoctena rudis (Meyrick, 1921)

Eupterotidae
Hemijana variegata Rothschild, 1917
Jana eurymas Herrich-Schäffer, 1854
Jana roseata Rothschild, 1917
Janomima mariana (White, 1843)
Stenoglene hilaris Felder, 1874
Stenoglene obtusus (Walker, 1864)
Stenoglene roseus (Druce, 1886)
Striphnopteryx edulis (Boisduval, 1847)

Gelechiidae
Anarsia agricola Walsingham, 1891
Anarsia citromitra Meyrick, 1921
Anarsia eriozona (Meyrick, 1921)
Anarsia semnopa Meyrick, 1921
Apotactis drimylota Meyrick, 1918
Araeophylla spiladias (Meyrick, 1921)
Asapharcha crateropa Meyrick, 1930
Brachmia craticula Meyrick, 1921
Brachyacma palpigera (Walsingham, 1891)
Dicranucha legalis (Meyrick, 1921)
Excommatica compsotoma (Meyrick, 1921)
Gelechia lactiflora Meyrick, 1921
Hedma microcasis (Meyrick, 1929)
Iochares straminis (Walsingham, 1881)
Neotelphusa melicentra (Meyrick, 1921)
Parallactis plaesiodes (Meyrick, 1920)
Pectinophora gossypiella (Saunders, 1844)
Scrobipalpa sibila (Meyrick, 1921)
Stomopteryx biangulata Meyrick, 1921
Tricerophora commaculata (Meyrick, 1921)
Trichotaphe monococca Meyrick, 1921

Geometridae
Acanthovalva bilineata (Warren, 1895)
Acanthovalva inconspicuaria (Hübner, 1819)
Biston exsilia Karisch, 2005
Cartaletis libyssa (Hopffer, 1857)
Chiasmia alternata (Warren, 1899)
Chiasmia amarata (Guenée, 1858)
Chiasmia ammodes (Prout, 1922)
Chiasmia assimilis (Warren, 1899)
Chiasmia boarmioides Krüger, 2001
Chiasmia brongusaria (Walker, 1860)
Chiasmia confuscata (Warren, 1899)
Chiasmia curvifascia (Warren, 1897)
Chiasmia deceptrix Krüger, 2001
Chiasmia extrusilinea (Prout 1925)
Chiasmia feraliata (Guenée, 1858)
Chiasmia fuscataria (Möschler, 1887)
Chiasmia grisescens (Prout, 1916)
Chiasmia inconspicua (Warren, 1897)
Chiasmia inquinata Krüger, 2001
Chiasmia kilimanjarensis (Holland, 1892)
Chiasmia majestica (Warren, 1901)
Chiasmia marmorata Warren, 1897
Chiasmia maronga Krüger, 2001
Chiasmia nana (Warren, 1898)
Chiasmia orientalis Krüger, 2001
Chiasmia paucimacula Krüger, 2001
Chiasmia rectistriaria (Herrich-Schäffer, 1854)
Chiasmia rhabdophora (Holland, 1892)
Chiasmia separata (Druce, 1882)
Chiasmia simplicilinea (Warren, 1905)
Chiasmia sororcula (Warren, 1897)
Chiasmia streniata (Guenée, 1858)
Chiasmia subcurvaria (Mabille, 1897)
Chiasmia tecnium (Prout 1916)
Chiasmia threnopsis (D. S. Fletcher, 1963)
Chiasmia umbrata (Warren, 1897)
Chiasmia umbratilis (Butler, 1875)
Comibaena leucospilata (Walker, 1863)
Diptychis meraca Prout, 1928
Heterorachis devocata (Walker, 1861)
Isturgia arizeloides Krüger, 2001
Isturgia catalaunaria (Guenée, 1857)
Isturgia deerraria (Walker, 1861)
Isturgia exospilata (Walker, 1861)
Isturgia spissata (Walker, 1862)
Isturgia supergressa (Prout 1913)
Metallochlora dyscheres Prout, 1922
Mixocera albistrigata (Pagenstecher, 1893)
Nassinia aurantiaca Prout, 1928
Neromia rhodomadia Prout, 1922
Nychiodes tyttha Prout, 1915
Omizodes ocellata Warren, 1894
Omizodes rubrifasciata (Butler, 1896)
Paragathia albimarginata Warren, 1902
Plateoplia acrobelia Wallengren 1875
Platypepla spurcata Warren 1897
Racotis apodosima Prout, 1931
Racotis squalida (Butler, 1878)
Rhodesia viridalbata Warren, 1905
Rhodometra audeoudi Prout, 1928
Rhodometra sacraria (Linnaeus, 1767)
Traminda neptunaria (Guenée, 1858)
Xanthisthisa tergorinota Prout, 1928
Xenimpia erosa Warren, 1895
Zamarada adiposata (Felder & Rogenhofer, 1875)
Zamarada bathyscaphes Prout, 1912
Zamarada crystallophana Mabille, 1900
Zamarada deceptrix Warren, 1914
Zamarada delosis D. S. Fletcher, 1974
Zamarada dentigera Warren, 1909
Zamarada differens Bastelberger, 1907
Zamarada erugata D. S. Fletcher, 1974
Zamarada euerces Prout, 1928
Zamarada flavicaput Warren, 1901
Zamarada glareosa Bastelberger, 1909
Zamarada ignicosta Prout, 1912
Zamarada ilma Prout, 1922
Zamarada inermis D. S. Fletcher, 1974
Zamarada metrioscaphes Prout, 1912
Zamarada phaeozona Hampson, 1909
Zamarada plana Bastelberger, 1909
Zamarada psammites D. S. Fletcher, 1958
Zamarada psectra D. S. Fletcher, 1974
Zamarada pulverosa Warren, 1895
Zamarada purimargo Prout, 1912
Zamarada rufilinearia Swinhoe, 1904
Zamarada scintillans Bastelberger, 1909
Zamarada seydeli D. S. Fletcher, 1974
Zamarada transvisaria (Guenée, 1858)
Zamarada varii D. S. Fletcher, 1974
Zamarada vulpina Warren, 1897

Gracillariidae
Aristaea bathracma (Meyrick, 1912)
Epicephala haplodoxa Vári, 1961
Pareclectis mimetis Vári, 1961
Phyllocnistis citrella Stainton, 1856
Stomphastis conflua (Meyrick, 1914)
Stomphastis thraustica (Meyrick, 1908)

Hepialidae
Gorgopis libania (Stoll, 1781)

Lacturidae
Gymnogramma flavivitella (Walsingham, 1881)

Lasiocampidae
Anadiasa affinis Aurivillius, 1911
Anadiasa schoenheiti (Wichgraf, 1922)
Anadiasa swierstrai Aurivillius, 1922
Braura truncatum (Walker, 1855)
Cleopatrina phocea (Druce, 1887)
Dinometa maputuana (Wichgraf, 1906)
Eucraera gemmata (Distant, 1897)
Eucraera koellikerii (Dewitz, 1881)
Eucraera salammbo (Vuillot, 1892)
Eutricha morosa (Walker, 1865)
Gonometa postica Walker, 1855
Gonometa robusta (Aurivillius, 1909)
Grammodora nigrolineata (Aurivillius, 1895)
Laeliopsis punctuligera Aurivillius, 1911
Pallastica pallens (Bethune-Baker, 1908)
Philotherma rosa (Druce, 1887)
Sophyrita argibasis (Mabille, 1893)
Stenophatna cymographa (Hampson, 1910)
Stenophatna hollandi (Tams, 1929)
Streblote polydora (Druce, 1887)
Trichopisthia monteiroi (Druce, 1887)

Lecithoceridae
Odites cuculans Meyrick, 1918
Odites incolumis Meyrick, 1918
Odites sucinea Meyrick, 1915

Limacodidae

Chrysopoloma isabellina Aurivillius, 1895
Chrysopoloma rosea Druce, 1886
Crothaema sericea Butler, 1880
Halseyia rectifascia (Hering, 1937)
Latoia vivida (Walker, 1865)
Latoia viridifascia Holland, 1893
Micraphe lateritia Karsch, 1896
Miresa habenichti Wichgraf, 1913
Omocenoides isophanes Janse, 1964
Scotinochroa inconsequens Butler, 1897
Scotinochroa rufescens Janse, 1964
Taeda gemmans (Felder, 1874)
Thosea rufimacula Joicey & Talbot, 1921
Trogocrada deleter Tams, 1953
Zinara discophora Hampson, 1910
Zinara nervosa Walker, 1869

Lymantriidae
Aclonophlebia rhodea Hampson, 1905
Aroa discalis Walker, 1855
Cimola opalina Walker, 1855
Crorema fulvinotata (Butler, 1893)
Dasychira cangia Druce, 1887
Euproctis dewitzi (Grünberg, 1907)
Euproctis pallida (Kirby, 1896)
Euproctis punctifera (Walker, 1855)
Griveaudyria cangia (Druce, 1887)
Homochira poecilosticta Collenette, 1938
Lacipa gracilis Hopffer, 1857
Naroma varipes (Walker, 1865)
Palasea albimacula Wallengren, 1863
Pteredoa subapicalis Hering, 1926

Lyonetiidae
Cycloponympha hermione Meyrick, 1921

Noctuidae
Achaea echo (Walker, 1858)
Achaea finita (Guenée, 1852)
Achaea lienardi (Boisduval, 1833)
Achaea mercatoria (Fabricius, 1775)
Achaea praestans (Guenée, 1852)
Acontia caffraria (Cramer, 1777)
Acontia discoidea Hopffer, 1857
Acontia guttifera Felder & Rogenhofer, 1874
Acontia hampsoni Hacker, Legrain & Fibiger, 2008
Acontia imitatrix Wallengren, 1856
Acontia insocia (Walker, 1857)
Acontia natalis (Guenée, 1852)
Acontia niphogona (Hampson, 1909)
Acontia psaliphora (Hampson, 1910)
Acontia trimaculata Aurivillius, 1879
Aegocera rectilinea Boisduval, 1836
Amazonides tabida (Guenée, 1852)
Anomis polymorpha Hampson, 1926
Antiophlebia bracteata Felder, 1874
Asota speciosa (Drury, 1773)
Athetis satellitia (Hampson, 1902)
Attatha ethiopica Hampson, 1910
Brephos decora (Linnaeus, 1764)
Brevipecten cornuta Hampson, 1902
Brevipecten wolframmeyi Hacker & Fibiger, 2007
Busseola fusca (Fuller, 1901)
Calliodes pretiosissima Holland, 1892
Cerocala vermiculosa Herrich-Schäffer, [1858]
Chrysodeixis chalcites (Esper, 1789)
Cometaster pyrula (Hopffer, 1857)
Compsotata elegantissima (Guenée, 1852)
Cuneisigna obstans (Walker, 1858)
Cyligramma latona (Cramer, 1775)
Cyligramma limacina (Guérin-Méneville, 1832)
Deinopa flavida Hampson, 1926
Diaphone eumela (Stoll, 1781)
Diaphone mossambicensis Hopffer, 1862
Diparopsis castanea Hampson, 1902
Dysgonia algira Linnaeus, 1767
Dysgonia albilinea (Hampson, 1918)
Dysgonia torrida (Guenée, 1852)
Egybolis vaillantina (Stoll, 1790)
Entomogramma pardus Guenée, 1852
Episparis leucotessellis Hampson, 1902
Erebus macrops (Linnaeus, 1767)
Erebus walkeri (Butler, 1875)
Ethiopica cupricolor (Hampson, 1902)
Eublemma anachoresis (Wallengren, 1863)
Eulocastra poliogramma Hampson, 1918
Eutelia callichroma (Distant, 1901)
Eutelia vulgaris Mabille, 1900
Feliniopsis africana (Schaus & Clements, 1893)
Gesonia stictigramma Hampson, 1926
Grammodes exclusiva Pagenstecher, 1907
Grammodes stolida (Fabricius, 1775)
Helicoverpa armigera (Hübner, 1808)
Heliophisma xanthoptera (Hampson, 1910)
Heraclia mozambica (Mabille, 1890)
Heraclia pentelia (Druce, 1887)
Heraclia perdix (Druce, 1887)
Heraclia superba (Butler, 1875)
Hespagarista echione (Boisduval, 1847)
Hydrillodes uliginosalis Guenée, 1854
Hypopyra capensis Herrich-Schäffer, 1854
Leucovis alba (Rothschild, 1897)
Marcipa mediana Hampson, 1926
Marcipa phaeodonta Hampson, 1926
Maxera brachypecten Hampson, 1926
Mecodina rufipalpis Hampson, 1926
Mentaxya ignicollis (Walker, 1857)
Mesogenea costimacula Hampson, 1926
Miniodes discolor Guenée, 1852
Mocis mayeri (Boisduval, 1833)
Mocis mutuaria (Walker, 1858)
Mocis undata (Fabricius, 1775)
Mythimna umbrigera (Saalmüller, 1891)
Oedebasis ovipennis Hampson, 1902
Ophiusa hypoxantha (Hampson, 1918)
Ophiusa legendrei Viette, 1967
Ophiusa tettensis (Hopffer, 1857)
Ozarba cryptochrysea (Hampson, 1902)
Ozarba fasciata (Wallengren, 1860)
Pangrapta melacleptra Hampson, 1926
Paralephana argyresthia Hampson, 1926
Plecopterodes moderata (Wallengren, 1860)
Proschaliphora albida Hampson, 1909
Pseudogyrtona nigrivitta Hampson, 1926
Sergiusia pentelia (Druce, 1887)
Sesamia calamistis Hampson, 1910
Sphingomorpha chlorea (Cramer, 1777)
Sommeria culta Hübner, 1831
Syngatha semipurpurea Hampson, 1918
Tavia latebra Hampson, 1926
Tephrialia vausema Hampson, 1926
Trigonodes hyppasia (Cramer, 1779)
Tycomarptes inferior (Guenée, 1852)
Zekelita angularis (Mabille, 1880)

Nolidae
Acaenica diaperas Hampson, 1918
Blenina quadripuncta Hampson, 1902
Bryothripa miophaea Hampson, 1912
Chlorozada metaleuca (Hampson, 1905)
Earias biplaga Walker, 1866
Earias insulana (Boisduval, 1833)
Megathripa rufimedia (Hampson, 1905)
Nola quilimanensis Strand, 1920
Nola socotrensis (Hampson, 1901)
Nola taeniata Snellen, 1874
Odontestis fuscicona (Hampson, 1910)
Paranola bipartita van Son, 1933
Paranola nigristriga van Son, 1933

Notodontidae
Amyops ingens Karsch, 1895
Antheua simplex Walker, 1855
Atrasana nigrosignata Kiriakoff, 1975
Bisolita rubrifascia (Hampson, 1910)
Deinarchia agramma (Hampson, 1910)
Desmeocraera moza Kiriakoff, 1962
Eurystauridia iphis Kiriakoff, 1968
Fentonina exacta Kiriakoff, 1962
Odontoperas heterogyna (Hampson, 1910)
Phalera atrata (Grünberg, 1907)
Pinheyia lymantrioides Kiriakoff, 1971
Psalisodes dimorpha Kiriakoff, 1968
Scrancia pinheyi Kiriakoff, 1965
Ulinodes costalis Kiriakoff, 1968

Oecophoridae
Isocrita phlyctidopa Meyrick, 1921
Lasiomactra acharista Meyrick, 1921
Oedematopoda princeps (Zeller, 1852)
Orygocera recordata Meyrick, 1921
Porthmologa deltophanes Meyrick, 1918
Stathmopoda aegotricha Meyrick, 1921
Stathmopoda teleozona Meyrick, 1921

Psychidae
Acanthopsyche emiliae (Heylaerts, 1890)
Albidopsis major (Heylaerts, 1890)
Barbaroscardia fasciata Walsingham, 1891
Diaphanopsyche rogenhoferi (Heylaerts, 1890)
Eumeta cervina Druce, 1887
Eumeta hardenbergeri Bourgogne, 1955
Gymnelema rougemontii Heylaerts, 1891
Melasina hippias Meyrick, 1921
Psyche trimeni Heylaerts, 1891
Typhonia linodyta (Meyrick, 1921)

Pterophoridae
Adaina propria Meyrick, 1921
Pselnophorus pachyceros Meyrick, 1921
Pterophorus albidus (Zeller, 1852)

Pyralidae
Aglossa suppunctalis de Joannis, 1927
Ancylosis platynephes de Joannis, 1927
Anobostra punctilimbalis (Ragonot, 1891)
Audeoudia grisella de Joannis, 1927
Bostra fumosa de Joannis, 1927
Eldana saccharina Walker, 1865
Emmalocera unitella de Joannis, 1927
Epicrocis nigrilinea (de Joannis, 1927)
Epicrocis striaticosta (de Joannis, 1927)
Epicrocis vicinella (de Joannis, 1927)
Epilepia melapastalis (Hampson, 1906)
Episindris albimaculalis Ragonot, 1891
Eucarphia hemityrella (de Joannis, 1927)
Eulophota bipars de Joannis, 1927
Eulophota floridella de Joannis, 1927
Eulophota pretoriella de Joannis, 1927
Eulophota simplex de Joannis, 1927
Euzophera hemileuca de Joannis, 1927
Euzophera specula de Joannis, 1927
Faveria albilinea (de Joannis, 1927)
Herculia cineralis de Joannis, 1927
Hypargyria impecuniosa de Joannis, 1927
Hypsotropa makulanella de Joannis, 1927
Joannisia hypolepias (de Joannis, 1927)
Laetilia hebraica de Joannis, 1927
Laodamia polygraphella de Joannis, 1927
Nephopterix cometella de Joannis, 1927
Oncocera bibasella (de Joannis, 1927)
Oncocera floridana (de Joannis, 1927)
Oncocera leucosticta (de Joannis, 1927)
Orthaga umbrimargo de Joannis, 1927
Ortholepis cretaciella de Joannis, 1927
Paralaodamia scalaris (de Joannis, 1927)
Pempelia apicella (de Joannis, 1927)
Pempelia morosalis (Saalmüller, 1880)
Phycita venalbella (de Joannis, 1927)
Pima difficilis de Joannis, 1927
Pima flavidorsella de Joannis, 1927
Pretoria audeoudi de Joannis, 1927
Prophtasia rosa de Joannis, 1927
Rhinaphe scripta de Joannis, 1927
Saluria nimbelloides de Joannis, 1927
Spatulipalpia monstrosa Balinsky, 1994
Stemmatophora bicincta de Joannis, 1927
Tegulifera audeoudi de Joannis, 1927
Trachylepidia fructicassiella Ragonot, 1887

Saturniidae

Adafroptilum austriorientale Darge, 2008
Adafroptilum incana (Sonthonnax, 1899)
Antistathmoptera daltonae Tams, 1935
Antistathmoptera rectangulata Pinhey, 1968
Argema mimosae (Boisduval, 1847)
Aurivillius arata (Westwood, 1849)
Bunaea alcinoe (Stoll, 1780)
Bunaeopsis hersilia (Westwood, 1849)
Bunaeopsis oubie (Guérin-Méneville, 1849)
Campimoptilum kuntzei (Dewitz, 1881)
Cinabra hyperbius (Westwood, 1881)
Cirina forda (Westwood, 1849)
Epiphora mythimnia (Westwood, 1849)
Gonimbrasia affinis (Bouvier, 1926)
Gonimbrasia belina (Westwood, 1849)
Gonimbrasia wahlbergii (Boisduval, 1847)
Gonimbrasia zambesina (Walker, 1865)
Gynanisa maja (Klug, 1836)
Holocerina angulata (Aurivillius, 1893)
Holocerina smilax (Westwood, 1849)
Imbrasia ertli Rebel, 1904
Lobobunaea angasana (Westwood, 1849)
Ludia delegorguei (Boisduval, 1847)
Ludia goniata Rothschild, 1907
Melanocera menippe (Westwood, 1849)
Micragone cana (Aurivillius, 1893)
Micragone nubifera Bouvier, 1936
Pselaphelia flavivitta (Walker, 1862)
Pseudaphelia apollinaris (Boisduval, 1847)
Pseudimbrasia deyrollei (J. Thomson, 1858)
Pseudobunaea irius (Fabricius, 1793)
Pseudobunaea tyrrhena (Westwood, 1849)
Usta terpsichore (Maassen & Weymer, 1885)

Sesiidae
Chamanthedon amorpha Hampson, 1919
Chamanthedon critheis (Druce, 1899)
Chamanthedon elymais (Druce, 1899)
Chamanthedon tiresa (Druce, 1899)
Episannina melanochalcia Le Cerf, 1917
Melittia boulleti Le Cerf, 1917
Melittia endoxantha Hampson, 1919
Melittia natalensis Butler, 1874
Paranthrene cuprescens Hampson, 1919
Sura pyrocera Hampson, 1919
Synanthedon vassei (Le Cerf, 1917)
Tipulamima sophax (Druce, 1899)
Vespanthedon cerceris Le Cerf, 1917

Sphingidae
Acherontia atropos (Linnaeus, 1758)
Agrius convolvuli (Linnaeus, 1758)
Afroclanis calcareus (Rothschild & Jordan, 1907)
Basiothia medea (Fabricius, 1781)
Centroctena imitans (Butler, 1882)
Coelonia fulvinotata (Butler, 1875)
Euchloron megaera (Linnaeus, 1758)
Falcatula falcata (Rothschild & Jordan, 1903)
Hippotion balsaminae (Walker, 1856)
Hippotion celerio (Linnaeus, 1758)
Hippotion osiris (Dalman, 1823)
Hippotion rosae (Butler, 1882)
Hippotion roseipennis (Butler, 1882)
Likoma crenata Rothschild & Jordan, 1907
Macroglossum trochilus (Hübner, 1823)
Nephele accentifera (Palisot de Beauvois, 1821)
Nephele argentifera (Walker, 1856)
Nephele bipartita Butler, 1878
Nephele comma Hopffer, 1857
Nephele peneus (Cramer, 1776)
Nephele rosae Butler, 1875
Odontosida magnificum (Rothschild, 1894)
Oligographa juniperi (Boisduval, 1847)
Phylloxiphia metria (Jordan, 1920)
Platysphinx piabilis (Distant, 1897)
Polyptychus baxteri Rothschild & Jordan, 1908
Sphingonaepiopsis nana (Walker, 1856)
Temnora marginata (Walker, 1856)
Temnora zantus (Herrich-Schäffer, 1854)
Theretra capensis (Linnaeus, 1764)
Theretra monteironis (Butler, 1882)

Thyrididae
Arniocera auriguttata Hopffer, 1857
Arniocera erythropyga (Wallengren, 1860)
Banisia joccatia (Whalley, 1971)
Banisia myrsusalis (Walker, 1859)
Cecidothyris pexa (Hampson, 1906)
Chrysotypus splendida (Warren, 1899)
Dysodia constellata Warren, 1908
Dysodia intermedia (Walker, 1865)
Dysodia vitrina (Boisduval, 1829)
Epaena candida Whalley, 1971
Gnathodes helvella Whalley, 1971
Hapana minima Whalley, 1971
Hapana verticalis (Warren, 1899)
Kalenga ansorgei (Warren, 1899)
Kalenga culanota Whalley, 1971
Kuja squamigera (Pagenstecher, 1892)
Marmax smaragdina (Butler, 1888)
Netrocera jordani Joicey & Talbot, 1921
Rhodoneura flavicilia Hampson, 1906
Rhodoneura roseola Whalley, 1971
Rhodoneura sordidula (Plötz, 1880)

Tineidae
Acridotarsa melipecta (Meyrick, 1915)
Ateliotum crymodes (Meyrick, 1908)
Ceratophaga vastellus (Zeller, 1852)
Crypsithyris insolita Meyrick, 1918
Drosica abjectella Walker, 1963
Ellochotis ectocharis Gozmány, 1976
Ellochotis lyncodes (Meyrick, 1921)
Enargocrasis galactopis (Meyrick, 1921)
Lysitona euryacta Meyrick, 1918
Machaeropteris eribapta Meyrick, 1915
Monopis megalodelta Meyrick, 1908
Opogona amphichorda Meyrick, 1921
Oxymachaeris euryzancla Meyrick, 1918
Perissomastix montis Gozmány, 1968
Perissomastix pyroxantha (Meyrick, 1914)
Pitharcha atrisecta (Meyrick, 1918)
Scalmatica myelodes (Meyrick, 1921)
Scalmatica phaulocentra (Meyrick, 1921)
Sphallestasis mahunkai Gozmány, 1976

Tortricidae
Afroploce karsholti Aarvik, 2004
Ancylis impatiens (Meyrick, 1921)
Bactra triceps Diakonoff, 1963
Choristoneura heliaspis (Meyrick, 1909)
Coniostola calculosa (Meyrick, 1913)
Coniostola lobostola (Meyrick, 1918)
Crocidosema leptozona (Meyrick, 1921)
Cydia trigonoptila (Meyrick, 1921)
Eccopsis affluens (Meyrick, 1921)
Eccopsis wahlbergiana Zeller, 1852
Eucosma haematospila Meyrick, 1921
Fulcrifera aphrospila (Meyrick, 1921)
Geita micrograpta (Meyrick, 1921)
Lobesia deltophora (Meyrick, 1921)
Metendothenia balanacma (Meyrick, 1914)
Olethreutes lutipennis (Meyrick, 1921)
Olethreutes niphadastra (Meyrick, 1921)
Paraeccopsis insellata (Meyrick, 1920)
Paraeccopsis phoeniodes (Meyrick, 1921)

Uraniidae
Epiplema anomala Janse, 1932

Xyloryctidae
Scythris clemens Meyrick, 1921
Scythris concurrens Meyrick, 1921

Yponomeutidae
Amalthina lacteata Meyrick, 1914
Teinoptila puncticornis (Walsingham, 1891)
Yponomeuta strigillatus Zeller, 1852

Zygaenidae
Astyloneura meridionalis (Hampson, 1920)
Epiorna ochreipennis (Butler, 1874)
Tasema fulvithorax Hampson, 1920

References 

Bassi & Trematerra, 2014. The Crambinae from Ethiopia and Mozambique collected by the University of Molise expeditions in 2008 and 2009 (Lepidoptera: Pyraloidea: Crambidae, Crambinae). Entomologia 2014; 2:160

External links

Moths
Moths
Mozambique